Whatever Happened to That Guy? is an Australian comedy series produced for The Comedy Channel. The series is a self-referential comedy series about the diminishing spotlight of a once-glorious comic, played by Peter Moon.

Synopsis

Peter Moon, once a comedy icon and star of television sketch comedy Fast Forward and breakfast radio, is now unemployed and facing a feeling of general redundancy and that of having ‘too much time on his hands’. Moon now seeks distraction in many forms such as a crusading consumer, keen bargain hunter; potential entrepreneur, inventor and budding film maker.

The show features some performers playing themselves, and others in broader comedic cameos, including Michael Veitch, Red Symons, John Blackman, Bruce Beresford, Greg McLean, Alyce Platt, Peter Smith and Wilbur Wilde. Moon's own family also appears.

This show could be considered to be the Australian equivalent to Larry David's Curb Your Enthusiasm.

Cast
 Peter Moon - Peter Moon
 Andrea Powell - Andrea Moon
 Paul Ireland - Bruno Stephens
 Benn Welford - Benn
 Tegan Higginbotham - Tegan 
 Tony Rickards - Lance Purves
 Jeremy Kewley - Dr Jeremy Kewley
 Maria Theodorakis - Lana Fink
 Luke Lennox - Luke Kewley

Episodes

Season 1 (2009)
 "Sicko" – 25 May 2009
 "How Now Bryan Brown?" – 1 June 2009
 "Fat Pig" – 8 June 2009
 "[Episode 4]" – 15 June 2009
 "Rhonda" – 26 June 2009
 "Charity" – 3 July 2009
 "A Dog Ate My USB Key" – 10 July 2009
 "[Episode 8]" – 17 July 2009

See also
 List of Australian television series

References

External links
 Official website

Australian comedy television series
The Comedy Channel original programming
2009 Australian television series debuts
2009 Australian television series endings